St. Gall may refer to:
 Saint Gall, Irish missionary in the German Alps
 Abbey of Saint Gall, Switzerland
 Sankt Gallen (disambiguation), various German-language eponyms of the saint
 St. Gallen, a city of Switzerland, whose English spelling is St Gall, and whose French name is Saint-Gall
 Gal I (Bishop of Clermont) (c.489–c.553)

See also
 Saint-Gall Cantatorium, the earliest surviving cantatorium of Gregorian chant.
 Gall (disambiguation)